The Andrew Jackson Downing Urn, also known as the Downing Urn, is a memorial and public artwork located in the Enid A. Haupt Garden of the Smithsonian Institution on the National Mall in Washington, D.C. 

The outdoor sculpture of a garden vase−urn commemorates Andrew Jackson Downing (1815–1852), an American landscape designer and horticulturalist, and considered to be one of the founders of American landscape architecture. Shortly before dying at the age of 37, Downing developed a landscape plan for the National Mall that the United States government partially implemented until replacing it with the McMillan Plan of 1902 (see History of the National Mall).

History
Architect and landscape designer Calvert Vaux designed the memorial urn, which Robert Eberhard Launitz sculpted. The urn was located and dedicated on the National Mall in September 1856, where it stood near the Smithsonian's National Museum of Natural History until 1965, when it was moved to the east entrance of the Smithsonian Institution Building (the "Castle").  In 1972, the urn was restored, moved to the west entrance of the Castle and rededicated. In 1987, it was relocated to the Rose Garden at the Castle's east door. The urn was moved to the Enid A. Haupt Garden in 1989.

Inscription
The inscription reads,
(on the south face of the base):

See also
 List of public art in Washington, D.C., Ward 2

References

External links
 
 The Downing Urn at Smithsonian Gardens
 Andrew Jackson Downing Urn at Histories of the National Mall

Outdoor sculptures in Washington, D.C.
Marble sculptures in Washington, D.C.
Sculptures of the Smithsonian Institution
1856 sculptures
Downing, Andrew Jackson Memorial
Public art in Washington, D.C.
Southwest Federal Center